Memmo Carotenuto (23 August 1908 – 23 December 1980) was an Italian actor. He appeared in 125 films between 1941 and 1980.

Selected filmography

The Wedding Trip (1969) 
 Assassination in Rome (1965)
 Male Companion (1964)
 Cocagne (1961)
 Ten Ready Rifles (1959)
 Ferdinando I, re di Napoli (1959)
 Everyone's in Love (1959)
 My Wife's Enemy (1959)
 Tuppe tuppe, Marescià! (1958)
 The Italians They Are Crazy (1958)
 Legs of Gold (1958)
 Big Deal on Madonna Street (1958)
 The Most Wonderful Moment (1957)
 Fathers and Sons (1957)
 Poveri ma belli (1957)
 The Bigamist (1956)
 Lucky to Be a Woman (1956)
 The Band of Honest Men (1956)
 Bread, Love and Jealousy (1954)
 A Slice of Life (1954)
 Too Bad She's Bad (1954)
 Disowned (1954)
 The Three Thieves (1954)
 House of Ricordi (1954)
 Via Padova 46 (1953)
 Pane, Amore e Fantasia (1953)
 If You Won a Hundred Million (1953)

References

External links

1908 births
1980 deaths
Italian male film actors
Male actors from Rome
Nastro d'Argento winners
20th-century Italian male actors
Burials at the Cimitero Flaminio